1956 Academy Awards may refer to:

 28th Academy Awards, the 1956 ceremony honoring the best in film for 1955
 29th Academy Awards, the 1957 ceremony honoring the best in film for 1956